Conosimus is a genus of planthoppers in the family Issidae.

References 

Issidae
Insects described in 1855
Hemiptera of Europe
Hemiptera of Africa